Game Rai Game Rak is a Thai television drama, premiered on October 28, 2011 and last aired on December 11, 2011 on Channel 3. It starred Nadech Kugimiya and Urassaya Sperbund.

Synopsis
Saichon (Nadech Kugimiya) is an islander living on Min island. One day, destiny leads him to find Fahlada (Urassaya Sperbund), a 17 years old girl lying unconscious on the beach. When she wakes up, he realizes that she lost all her memories. Saichon takes care of her and names her Nang Fah (angel) because he doesn't know her real name and she doesn't remember it. They fall in love with each other and live together.

One day, Chompooprae (Natwara Wongwasana), Fahlada's adopted sister saw her sister's picture in the tourist magazine, so she sends people to take Fahlada back. Chompooprae needs Fahlada in order for her to succeed in her adopted family's business. Chompooprae hires Yasa and his men to bring Fahlada back even though she fights to stay with Saichon. Saichon gets shot and has to recover all by himself. Fahlada gets shock therapy treatment until she regains her memories, but she loses her memories about Saichon and everything during the time that she was missing on Min Island. Chompooprae lies to her sister and doesn't tell her anything about Min island.

When Saichon awakens, he is devastated to learn that his Nang Fah is gone. He decides to go to Bangkok to look for her. Many years later, Saichon comes back from America to take care of the airline company in Thailand. He meets Chompooprae because she's the business partner he needs to work with. Chompooprae falls in love with him at first sight even though she is already engaged to P'Mor. So, she introduces him to her sister. Saichon is surprised and very glad when he meets Fahlada again. However, Fahlada's sister [chompooprae] and Yasa plots against Saichon and Fah which leads Saichon to believe falsely that Fahlada regained her memory and is disgusted by her past [which is not true].
This makes Saichon angry and leads him to rape/misbehave with Fahlada as she is his wife and starts abusing her to keep her forever with him and also for looking down on the past.

Later when he came to know the truth, he will realize his mistake and begs for forgiveness, their fate now resides on Fahlada who has to decide where they stand.

Cast

Main
 Nadech Kugimiya (Barry) as Saichon/Charles
 Urassaya Sperbund (Yaya) as Fahlada/Nang Fah
 Natwara Wongwasana (Mint) as Chompooprae, Fahlada's adoptive sister.
 Tanawat Wattanaputi (Pope) as Dr. Wattana

Supporting 
 Savitree Suttichanond (Beau) as Mami
 Methus Treewattanawareesin (Jack) as James
 Chotika Wongwilas (Noey) as Plernta
 Pisanu Nimsakul (Boy) as Sahat
 Chalermpol Thikamporntheerawong (Jack) as Taeloy
 Wut Surinthorn as Thongthai
 Kajanathaneeya Srirojwattana (Kitty) as Suay
 Kluay Chernyim as Sala
 Paweena Charivsakul (Jeab) as Saengdao
 Panyapol Dejsong (AA) as Yasa
 Wiyada Umarin as Pirka
 Theerachart Theerawittayangkool (Aood) as Nara
 Sripan Boonnak as Areefa
 Baromwut Hiranyatsathiti (Mik) as Veeradech
 Duangjai Hathaikarn as Aunt Niam
 Peter Thunasatra as Michael

Awards and nominations

References

External links
 

Thai television soap operas
2011 Thai television series debuts
2011 Thai television series endings
2010s Thai television series
Channel 3 (Thailand) original programming